Pope Air Force Base Historic District is a historic airplane hangar located at Pope Air Force Base, Fayetteville, Cumberland County, North Carolina.  It was built in 1934, and has a double-bay metal superstructure resting on a concrete foundation and floor. It is of bowstring truss construction. The building measures 333 feet, 6 inches, by 124 feet.

It was listed on the National Register of Historic Places in 1991.

References

Military facilities on the National Register of Historic Places in North Carolina
Transport infrastructure completed in 1934
Buildings and structures in Fayetteville, North Carolina
National Register of Historic Places in Cumberland County, North Carolina
1934 establishments in North Carolina